Number 23 Squadron is a squadron of the Royal Air Force responsible for 'day-to-day space operations', having been reformed in January 2021, as the first "space squadron". Up until its disbandment in October 2009, it operated the Boeing Sentry AEW1 Airborne Warning And Control System (AWACS) aircraft from RAF Waddington, Lincolnshire.

History

First World War
No. 23 Squadron of the Royal Flying Corps was formed at Fort Grange, Gosport on 1 September 1915, commanded by Louis Strange and equipped with a mixture of types. A detachment of Royal Aircraft Factory B.E.2C's were deployed to Sutton's Farm to act as night fighters to oppose raids by German Zeppelins, but no successful interceptions resulted. The squadron moved to France on 16 March 1916 flying FE2b two-seat pusher fighters. The squadron used the FE2b on close-escort duties and to fly standing patrols to engage hostile aircraft wherever they could be found, helping to establish air superiority in the build-up to the Battle of the Somme.

By the end of the year the "Fee" was obsolete, and the Squadron started to receive Spad S.VII single-seat fighters in February 1917, with its last F.E.2s in April 1917. 23 Squadron flew its SPADs both on offensive fighter patrols over the front and low-level strafing attacks against German troops. In December 1917 it replaced its SPAD S.VII with the more powerful and heavier armed Spad S.XIII. The squadron converted to Sopwith Dolphins in April 1918 until it disbanded just after the war on 31 December 1919. It numbered 19 aces among its ranks during the war, including: 
William Kennedy-Cochran-Patrick;  
Douglas U. McGregor;
James Pearson;
Clive W. Warman,; 
Frederick Gibbs; 
Conn Standish O'Grady; 
Herbert Drewitt; 
James Fitz-Morris; 
Harold Albert White; 
Alfred Edwin McKay; 
Harry Compton; and
Arthur Bradfield Fairclough, MC.

Reformation

The squadron was re-formed on 1 July 1925 at RAF Henlow with the Sopwith Snipe, under command of the First World War air ace Raymond Collishaw. The squadron re-equipped with more modern Gloster Gamecock fighters in May 1926, and moved to RAF Kenley in February 1927. 

In April 1931 the squadron partly re-equipped with Bristol Bulldogs, another single seat fighter, while continuing to operate the Gamecock. Both the Gamecock and Bulldog were outperformed by the Hawker Hart light bomber which had recently entered service with the RAF, and in June 1931, the squadron received a single Hart for evaluation as a two seat fighter. The evaluation was a success, and a flight of six fighter variants of the Hart, designated the Hart Fighter replaced the squadrons remaining Gamecocks from October that year. The squadron moved to RAF Biggin Hill in September 1932 and by April 1933, was fully equipped with Hart fighters, which by then were known as Hawker Demons.

The Abyssinia Crisis in September 1935 led to the squadron being stripped of both aircraft and men in order to reinforce squadrons that were temporarily deployed overseas, with the squadron inventory dropping to a single aircraft in March 1936 before returning to full strength. It moved to RAF Northolt in December 1936, moving again in May 1938, this time to RAF Wittering. In December 1938 the squadron replaced its obsolete Demon biplanes with the Bristol Blenheim twin-engine monoplane, another bomber converted to a fighter.

Second World War

On the outbreak of the Second World War the squadron, still equipped with Blenheims, became a night-fighter squadron. The squadron scored its first victory of the war on 18 June 1940, when a German Heinkel He 111 was shot down over Cley next the Sea, Norfolk, with another He 111 being shot down the same night, although two Blenheims were lost to return fire from German bombers. As the Blenheim was too slow and lightly armed to be an effective night fighter, the squadron began to operate in the night intruder role in December 1940, attacking German bombers as they returned to their airfields in France. From March 1941 the squadron replaced its Blenheims with the American Douglas Havoc, which were supplemented by the Boston III variant of the Havoc in February 1942.

In July 1942 the squadron re-equipped with the more capable de Havilland Mosquito. In December 1942 the squadron transferred to the Mediterranean, flying from RAF Luqa on Malta. It attacked enemy airfields and railway targets in Sicily, Tunisia and Italy through 1943, moving to Sardinia in December 1943, which allowed targets in Southern France to be attacked. In June 1944 the squadron returned to England, operating from RAF Little Snoring in Norfolk as part of 100 Group. The role of 100 Group was bomber support, i.e. to disrupt the Luftwaffe's attempts to stop the British bomber offensive, with 23 Squadron being tasked with low level night intruder operations against German night fighters. In addition to its normal night time operations, the squadron also carried out daylight bomber escort missions. 23 Sqn was disbanded, following the war's end, on 25 September 1945.

Postwar operations
The squadron was reformed on 1 September 1946 as a night fighter squadron operating the de Havilland Mosquito. It received jet aircraft in the form of de Havilland Vampire NF.10s in 1953, replacing them with de Havilland Venom NF.2s in June 1954. The squadron acquired Venom NF.3 in 1957.
 

In 1957 the squadron converted to the Gloster Javelin all-weather fighter, beginning a long period operating in the air defence role. The squadron has a strong heritage in the air defence role, operating Gloster Javelins, Lightnings, Phantoms and Tornado F3s. The squadron first acquired Phantoms on 1 November 1975 at RAF Coningsby  before moving to RAF Wattisham for just under 10 years. Then in October 1983 the squadron deployed to Stanley airfield, Falkland Islands after their recapture from Argentina, arriving there on 1 November. They remained here until 31 October 1988 when its duty was assumed by 1435 Flight. The squadron then reformed on 1 November 1988 at RAF Leeming with the Panavia Tornado which it operated until 26 February 1994, when the unit was disbanded.

The squadron assumed the Airborne Early Warning role upon reformation in April 1996, sharing the RAF's Sentry AEW1 fleet with No. 8 Squadron. The squadron disbanded on 2 October 2009, when it amalgamated with No 8 Squadron.

Future

At the Air & Space Power Conference on 17 July 2019 it was announced that the squadron would reform as the RAF's first dedicated squadron to deal with space. And in early January 2021, the squadron was reformed as a 'space squadron', which will be "responsible for day-to-day space command-and-control".

Notable squadron members
Douglas Bader was a member of 23 Squadron when he crashed carrying out low level aerobatics, losing his legs in the process. He went on to become one of the highest scoring aces of the RAF in World War II. Air Officer Commanding Sir Peter Wykeham was credited with shooting down at least 15 hostile aircraft at various theatres of World War II. He was later promoted to Air Marshal. He served as Officer Commanding No. 38 Group from 1960, the Director of the Joint Warfare Staff from 1962, the Commander of the Far East Air Force from 1964 and the Deputy Chief of the Air Staff from 1967 before retiring in 1969. Andrew George Walton flew with the squadron in Tornados and Phantoms, and rose to the rank of Air Vice Marshal, receiving a CBE (Commander of the Order of the British Empire) in the process, before retiring in 2010.

Wing Commander A J 'Red' Owen DFC and Bar, AFC, DFM, was 23 Squadron's commanding officer between May 1962 and October 1964. He was one of the RAFs most successful night fighter pilots during World War II, credited with destroying at least 15 enemy aircraft.

Air Commodore Charles Kingsford Smith MC, Australian Aviation pioneer was assigned to the Squadron in July 1917, while in the Squadron he shot down four German fighters before being shot down himself, he would go on to hold a training role within the Squadron.

Aircraft operated

 Bleriot XI
 Caudron G.III
 Farman Shorthorn
 Avro 504
 Martinsyde S1
 BE2c
 FE2b
 Martinsyde G.100
 SPAD S.VII
 SPAD S.XIII
 Sopwith Dolphin
 Sopwith Snipe
 Gloster Gamecock
 Bristol Bulldog
 Hawker Hart
 Hawker Demon
 Bristol Blenheim
 Douglas Havoc I
 Douglas Boston III
 De Havilland Mosquito
 De Havilland Vampire NF.10
 De Havilland Venom
 Gloster Javelin
 English Electric Lightning
 McDonnell-Douglas Phantom FGR2
 Panavia Tornado F3
 Boeing Sentry AEW1

See also
 List of Royal Air Force aircraft squadrons

Notes

Bibliography

 Halley, James J. Famous Fighter Squadrons of the RAF: Volume 1. Windsor, Berkshire, UK: Hylton Lacey Publishers Ltd., 1971. .
 Halley, James J. The Squadrons of the Royal Air Force. Tonbridge, Kent, UK: Air Britain (Historians) Ltd., 1980. 
 Halley, James J. The Squadrons of the Royal Air Force & Commonwealth 1918–1988. Tonbridge, Kent, UK: Air Britain (Historians) Ltd., 1988. .
 Jefford, C.G. RAF Squadrons, a Comprehensive record of the Movement and Equipment of all RAF Squadrons and their Antecedents since 1912. Shropshire, UK: Airlife Publishing, 1988 (second edition 2001). .
 Lewis, Peter. Squadron Histories: R.F.C, R.N.A.S and R.A.F., 1912–59. London: Putnam, 1959.
 Mason, Francis K. The British Fighter since 1912. Annapolis, Maryland, USA:Naval Institute Press, 1992. .
 Rawlings, John. Fighter Squadrons of the RAF and their Aircraft. London: Macdonald and Jane's Publishers Ltd., 1969 (second edition 1976). .
 Shores, Christopher; Franks, Norman & Guest, Russell. Above The Trenches: A Complete Record of the Fighter Aces and Units of the British Empire Air Forces 1915–1920. London: Grub Street, 1990. .

External links

023
Military units and formations established in 1915
023 Squadron
Military units and formations disestablished in 2009